Agni Pareeksha is a 1981 Bollywood crime film produced by B. R. Chopra and directed by Kamal Majumdar.

Cast 
Amol Palekar as Alok Chaudhary / Ramesh Khanna
Parikshit Sahni as  Siddharth Sharma
Rameshwari as  Meeta
Veena as Karuna Chaudhary
Utpal Dutt as Ex-Manager Gupta
Iftekhar as Psychiatrist Dr. Sen
Shreeram Lagoo as Advocate Anupam
S. N. Banerjee as Jailor
Jankidas as Ramu
Nana Palsikar as Dinanath Sharma
Jagdish Raj as Police Inspector
Dinesh Singh as  Dilip Thakur (Karuna's Brother)

Soundtrack 
Lyrics: Yogesh

External links 
 

1981 crime films
1981 films
1990s Hindi-language films
Films scored by Salil Chowdhury